Jwacheon station is the name of two railroad stations in Busan, South Korea.

 Jwacheon station (Korail)
 Jwacheon station (Busan Metro)